Ziska may refer to:

 Jan Žižka, a Czech military officer
 Ziska: The Problem of a Wicked Soul, a horror novel by Marie Corelli, first published in 1897